The Northern Adelbert or Pihom–Isumrud languages are a family of twenty languages in the Madang stock of New Guinea. The occupy the coastal northern Adelbert Range of mountains directly opposite Karkar Island, as opposed to the Southern Adelbert languages, another branch of Madang.

Malcolm Ross posited a "linkage" connecting the Northern Adelbert languages with the Mabuso languages, and named this group Croisilles , as the two families bracket Cape Croisilles (Northern Adelbert to the north, Mabuso to the south). However, Ross never claimed Croisilles was an actual language family, and other researchers have rejected the connection.

Languages
There are approximately 20 Northern Adelbert languages.

Below is a comparison of Northern Adelbert language names in Pick (2020) and Z'graggen (1980). A few alternate names from Capell (1952) are also given.

Classification
Croisilles was first posited by Malcolm Ross (1995), not as an actual language family, but as a linkage. It was a merger of Wurm's Pihom-Isumrud-Mugil and Mabuso stocks, each of which contained 25–30 languages. Pick (2017, 2020) and Usher reject the merger, and provisionally the inclusion of Mugil (Bargam), though Pick retains the name. Usher disambiguates the (non-Mabuso) family as 'Adelbert Range'.

Usher (2020)
Timothy Usher classifies the languages as follows.

Adelbert Range – Isumrud Strait
Kowan (Isumrud Strait): Waskia, Korak (Amako)
(North) Adelbert Range
Yamben
Omosan (Omosa River): Pal (Abasakur), Kobol (Koguman)
Gilagil River (old Isumrud proper)
 Dimir (Gavak)
 Brem (Bunabun), Malas (Manep)
Northwest Adelbert Range (Mount Pihom)
Kaukombar River: Mala (Pay), Miani (Maiani, Tani), Maia (Pila, Saki)
Kumil–Timper
Kumil River: Bepour, Mauwake (Ulingan), Moere
Tiboran River (Timper River): Musar; Wanambre; Kowaki, Mawak, Pamosu (Hinihon)
Mabulap–Numugen
 Amaimon (Mabulap) isolate
Numugen River (see)

Pick (2020)
Below is Andrew Pick's (2020) classification of the Northern Adelbert languages.

Manep–Barem languages: Manep, Barem
Kumil–Tibor languages
Kumil languages: Mauwake, Bepour, Moere
Tibor languages: Pamosu, Hember Avu, Mokati, Mawak, Kowaki
Numugen languages: Usan, Karian, Yaben, Yarawata, Parawen, Ukuriguma
Kaukombar languages: Maia, Mala, Miani, Maiani
Gavak

Pick (2017)
A quite similar internal classification was worked out independently by Pick (2017). Pick could not establish regular sound correspondences with Kobol–Pal (Omosan) or Amaimon (Mabulap), and thus leaves them out of the family. 

Northern Adelbert
Kumil–Tibor (*t- > s, *p- > f, *ŋ > zero)
Tibor [*-n > zero, *a > e] 
Mokati (Wanambre)
(*k- > h, *C- > [−voice]) Kowaki, Mawak, Pamosu, Hember Avu (Musar)
Kumil [*k- *t- > , *C- > [−voice], *-k > zero]: Bepour, Mauwake, Moere
Kaukombar [*k- *ŋ *-n > zero]: Mala, Miani, Maiani, Maia
Manep–Barem [*-ŋ > n, *-g > ŋ, *wV > u]
Manep (Malas)
Barem (Brem)
Gabak (Dimir)
Numugen (*ŋ > n, 6 languages)
Amako–Waskia: Waskia, Korak

Pick notes that Barem and Malas share pronominal markers on the verbs 'to teach' and 'to show' that are unique to those two verbs.

Proto-language

A phonological reconstruction of Proto-Northern Adelbert has been proposed by Pick (2020).

Phonology
Pick (2020) reconstructs the phonemes of Proto-Northern Adelbert as:

Four vowels are reconstructed by Pick (2020): *a, *e, *i, *u. Although Northern Adelbert languages usually have the five vowels /a e i o u/, Pick (2020) does not consider *o to be reconstructable.

Pronouns
The Proto-Northern Adelbert pronouns are:

Lexicon
Selected lexical reconstructions from Pick (2020) are listed below.

Comparisons
Below is a list of Proto-Northern Adelbert forms that are descended from Proto-Trans–New Guinea.

References

Further reading

Ross, Malcolm. 2014. Proto-Croisilles. TransNewGuinea.org.
Ross, Malcolm. 2014. Proto-Mabuso. TransNewGuinea.org.
Ross, Malcolm. 2014. Proto-North-Adelbert. TransNewGuinea.org.
Ross, Malcolm. 2014. Proto-Isumrud. TransNewGuinea.org.
Ross, Malcolm. 2014. Proto-Pihom. TransNewGuinea.org.
Ross, Malcolm. 2014. Proto-Tibor-Omosa. TransNewGuinea.org.
Ross, Malcolm. 2014. Proto-Kaukombar. TransNewGuinea.org.
Ross, Malcolm. 2014. Proto-Kumil. TransNewGuinea.org.
Ross, Malcolm. 2014. Proto-Numugen. TransNewGuinea.org.

External links
Current research on the Madang languages by Andrew Pick

 
Languages of Papua New Guinea
Adelbert languages